The Bronzeman was a magazine published in Chicago, Illinois, from 1929 to 1933. It was founded by investor Robert Cole, president of the Chicago Metropolitan Mutual Assurance Company, and edited by Caswell W. Crews. The magazine featured original fiction and poetry, alongside a broad range of lifestyle and entertainment articles targeted at an African American audience. The tagline of the magazine was "A popular magazine for all." The Bronzeman also featured covers designs by African American artists including Charles C. Dawson and fiction from writers including Chester Himes and Anita Scott Coleman.

References

External links
 The Bronzeman vol. 3 no. 7 at the Smithsonian

African-American magazines
Defunct magazines published in the United States
Magazines established in 1929
Magazines disestablished in 1933
Magazines published in Chicago
Monthly magazines published in the United States
Lifestyle magazines published in the United States